Manoel Almeida Júnior (born December 31, 1985 in Campos dos Goytacazes), known by his nickname Pirão, is a Brazilian footballer who plays for Madureira as left back.

Career statistics

References

External links

1985 births
Living people
Brazilian footballers
Association football defenders
Campeonato Brasileiro Série B players
Campeonato Brasileiro Série D players
Americano Futebol Clube players
Clube de Regatas Brasil players
Associação Desportiva São Caetano players
Associação Atlética Ponte Preta players
Criciúma Esporte Clube players
Avaí FC players
Madureira Esporte Clube players
People from Campos dos Goytacazes
Sportspeople from Rio de Janeiro (state)